Ryan Telfer (born 4 March 1994) is a Trinidadian professional footballer who plays as a winger for USL Championship club Miami FC and the Trinidad and Tobago national team.

Club career

Early career
Born in Canada, Telfer was raised in Trinidad, where his parents were from, and began playing with Skhy FC. He later returned to Canada and played youth soccer with Erin Mills Eagles, and was eventually signed in 2012 to their senior team the Mississauga Eagles FC in the Canadian Soccer League. In 2014, he played in the Ontario Soccer League with Erin Mills Eagles, where he finished as the top goalscorer in the Provincial U21 West division. In 2015, he played at the college level with the York Lions where he won the OUA and CIS championship. Further achievements included receiving OUA West second-team all-star honours and the OUA silver medal. Telfer played with League1 Ontario club Vaughan Azzurri during the 2016 season.

Toronto FC II
On March 24, 2017 he signed with Toronto FC II of the United Soccer League. He made his debut on March 25, 2017 against Phoenix Rising FC, where he scored the lone goal in a 1–0 victory.

Toronto FC
On April 13, 2018, Telfer signed with Major League Soccer side Toronto FC. On April 14, 2018, Telfer made his debut for the first team, in a Major League Soccer game against the Colorado Rapids. On May 18, 2018 Telfer scored his first MLS goal against Orlando City which was the game winner for TFC. Telfer would have his option for the 2020 season declined by Toronto, ending his time with the club after nine seasons. The decision to have the club not pick up his option was a mutual decision between Telfer and the club to provide him with better playing opportunities.

Loan to York
On March 6, 2019, Telfer was sent on a season-long loan to Canadian Premier League side York9 FC. Telfer scored the first goal in Canadian Premier League history against Forge FC in the league's inaugural match on April 27, 2019, which eventually ended in a 1–1 away draw.

Nea Salamis
On January 29, 2020, Telfer signed with Cypriot First Division side Nea Salamis.

Return to York
After leaving Nea Salamis in May 2020 due to the COVID-19 pandemic, Telfer returned to Canada and re-joined York9 on June 3. The contract had various "triggers and incentives" that could extend its length.

Atlético Ottawa
On April 20, 2021, Telfer signed with Atlético Ottawa. He made his debut for Ottawa in their season opening 2–0 victory over FC Edmonton. Telfer scored his first goal for his new club on August 2, netting the lone Ottawa tally in a 2–1 loss to the HFX Wanderers. Later in the month on August 29 in a rematch against the Wanderers, Telfer was sent off after a confrontation with the referee and HFX player João Morelli following foul which yielded a yellow card. He was subsequently suspended and sanctioned by Canada Soccer, missing five games. In January 2022 Atlético Ottawa confirmed they had declined Telfer's contract option, ending his time with the club.

Columbus Crew 2
On April 1, 2022, Columbus Crew 2 announced that they had signed Telfer. Following the 2022 season, he was released by Columbus.

Miami FC
In January 2023, he signed with Miami FC of the USL Championship.

International career
Born in Canada, and raised in Trinidad and Tobago, Telfer was eligible for both countries. In August 2019, Canada coach John Herdman mentioned Telfer was a player he was monitoring. However, on September 3, 2019 he was called up to Trinidad and Tobago for two CONCACAF Nations League matches against Martinique. Telfer made his debut for Trinidad and Tobago in the first match against Martinique three days later on September 6. In the second match on September 9, he scored his first international goal.

In June 2021 Telfer was named to Trinidad and Tobago's squad for the 2021 CONCACAF Gold Cup qualification tournament

Career statistics

Club

International goals 
Scores and results list Trinidad and Tobago's goal tally first. Score column indicates score after each Telfer goal.

References

External links
 
 
 York Lions profile

1994 births
Living people
Association football wingers
Citizens of Trinidad and Tobago through descent
Trinidad and Tobago footballers
Canadian soccer players
Soccer players from Mississauga
Canadian sportspeople of Trinidad and Tobago descent
Black Canadian soccer players
Canadian expatriate soccer players
Trinidad and Tobago expatriate footballers
Expatriate footballers in Cyprus
Canadian expatriate sportspeople in Cyprus
Trinidad and Tobago expatriate sportspeople in Cyprus
Mississauga Eagles FC players
York Lions soccer players
Vaughan Azzurri players
Toronto FC II players
Toronto FC players
York United FC players
Nea Salamis Famagusta FC players
Atlético Ottawa players
Canadian Soccer League (1998–present) players
League1 Ontario players
USL Championship players
Major League Soccer players
Canadian Premier League players
Cypriot First Division players
Trinidad and Tobago international footballers
Columbus Crew 2 players
MLS Next Pro players
Miami FC players